The 1904 Texas Longhorns football team represented the University of Texas at Austin in the 1904 college football season. In their second year under head coach Ralph Hutchinson, the Longhorns compiled a 6–2 and outscored opponents by a collective total of 219 to 88.

Schedule

References

Texas
Texas Longhorns football seasons
Texas Longhorns football